There are 44 species of shark found in the Red Sea. This list is not exhaustive.

Bathydemersal species

Benthopelagic species

Demersal species

Pelagic species

Reef-associated species

See also

List of sharks

References

FishBase. Ed. Ranier Froese and Daniel Pauly

red
'shark
'red